The Romaine is a 25.4 km long river in Haute-Saône in Bourgogne-Franche-Comté, eastern France. It rises in Fondremand and flows generally west to join the Saône at Vellexon-Queutrey-et-Vaudey.

References

Rivers of France
Rivers of Bourgogne-Franche-Comté
Rivers of Haute-Saône